Toxicodendron diversilobum (syn. Rhus diversiloba), commonly named Pacific poison oak or western poison oak, is a woody vine or shrub in the sumac family, Anacardiaceae. It is widely distributed in western North America, inhabiting conifer and mixed broadleaf forests, woodlands, grasslands, and chaparral biomes. Peak flowering occurs in May. Like other members of the genus Toxicodendron, T. diversilobum causes itching and allergic rashes in most people after contact by touch or smoke inhalation. Despite its name, it is not closely related to oaks.

Description
Toxicodendron diversilobum is extremely variable in growth habit and leaf appearance. It reproduces by spreading rhizomes and by seeds.

The plant is winter deciduous, so that after cold weather sets in, the stems are leafless and bear only the occasional cluster of mature fruit. Without leaves the stems may sometimes be identified by occasional black marks where its milky sap may have oozed and dried.

They generally resemble the lobed leaves of a true oak, though tend to be more glossy. Leaves are typically bronze when first unfolding in February to March, bright green in the spring, yellow-green to reddish in the summer, and bright red or pink from late July to October.

White flowers form in the spring, from March to June. If they are fertilized, they develop into greenish-white or tan drupes.

Botanist John Howell observed that the plant's toxicity obscures its aesthetic values: 
In spring, the ivory flowers bloom on the sunny hill or in sheltered glade, in summer its fine green leaves contrast refreshingly with dried and tawny grassland, in autumn its colors flame more brilliantly than in any other native, but one great fault, its poisonous juice, nullifies its every other virtue and renders this beautiful shrub the most disparaged of all within our region.

Distribution and habitat 
Toxicodendron diversilobum is found in California (Los Angeles was built on the site of a village named Yaangna or iyáanga’, meaning "poison oak place"), the Baja California Peninsula, Nevada, Oregon, Washington, and British Columbia. The related T. pubescens (eastern poison oak) is native to the Southeastern United States. T. diversilobum and T. rydbergii (western poison ivy) hybridize in the Columbia River Gorge area.

Toxicodendron diversilobum is common in various habitats, from mesic riparian zones to xeric chaparral. It thrives in shady and dappled light through full and direct sunlight conditions, at elevations below . The vining form can climb up large shrub and tree trunks into their canopies. Sometimes it kills the support plant by smothering or breaking it. The plant often occurs in chaparral and woodlands, coastal sage scrub, grasslands, and oak woodlands; and Douglas-fir (Pseudotsuga menzesii), hemlock–Sitka spruce, Sequoia sempervirens (coast redwood), Pinus ponderosa (Ponderosa pine), and mixed evergreen forests.

Ecology 
Black-tailed deer, mule deer, California ground squirrels, western gray squirrels, and other indigenous fauna feed on the leaves of the plant. It is rich in phosphorus, calcium, and sulfur. Bird species use the berries for food, and utilize the plant structure for shelter. Neither native animals nor horses, livestock, or dogs demonstrate reactions to urushiol.

Due to human allergic reactions, T. diversilobum is usually eradicated from gardens and public landscaped areas. It can be a weed in agricultural fields, orchards, and vineyards. It is usually removed by pruning, herbicides, digging out, or a combination.

Toxicity 

Toxicodendron diversilobum leaves and twigs have a surface oil, urushiol, which causes an allergic reaction. It causes contact dermatitis – an immune-mediated skin inflammation – in four-fifths of humans. Most, if not all, will become sensitized over time with repeated or more concentrated exposure to urushiol.

The active components of urushiol have been determined to be unsaturated congeners of 3-heptadecylcatechol with up to three double bonds in an unbranched C17 side chain. In poison ivy, these components are unique in that they contain a -CH2CH2- group in an unbranched alkyl side chain.

Exposure 
Toxicodendron diversilobum skin contact first causes itching; then evolves into dermatitis with inflammation, colorless bumps, severe itching, and blistering. In the dormant deciduous seasons the plant can be difficult to recognize, however contact with leafless branches and twigs also causes allergic reactions.

Urushiol volatilizes when burned, and human exposure to T. diversilobum smoke is extremely hazardous, from wildfires, controlled burns, or disposal fires. The smoke can poison people who thought they were immune. Branches used to toast food over campfires can cause reactions internally and externally.

Urushiol is also found in the skin of mangos, posing a danger to people sensitized to T. diversilobum when eating the fruit while it is still in the rind.

Uses

Medicinal
Californian Native Americans used the plant's stems and shoots to make baskets, the sap to cure ringworm, and as a poultice of fresh leaves applied to rattlesnake bites. The juice or soot was used as a black dye for sedge basket elements, tattoos, and skin darkening.

An infusion of dried roots, or buds eaten in the spring, were taken by some native peoples for an immunity from the plant poisons.

Chumash peoples used T. diversilobum sap to remove warts, corns, and calluses; to cauterize sores; and to stop bleeding. They drank a decoction made from the roots to treat dysentery.

Cultivation
Toxicodendron diversilobum can be a carefully situated component in wildlife gardens, habitat gardens, and natural landscaping.

The plant is used in habitat restoration projects. It can be early stage succession where woodlands have been burned or removed, serving as a nurse plant for other species.

See also
Toxicodendron vernix – poison sumac
Toxicodendron radicans – eastern poison ivy

References

Gallery

External links

U.S. Forest Service information: Toxicodendron diversilobum (Pacific poison oak)
Calflora Database: Toxicodendron diversilobum (Pacific poison oak)
Jepson Flora Project: Toxicodendron diversilobum
American Academy of Dermatology – Poison Oak information
Western Poison-Oak Photo Gallery
All about Western poison oak (T. Diversilobum)
Toxicodendron diversilobum – U.C. Photo gallery

diversilobum
Flora of the West Coast of the United States
Flora of Baja California
Flora of British Columbia
Flora of California
Flora of Nevada
Flora of Oregon
Flora of Washington (state)
Flora of the Cascade Range
Flora of the Klamath Mountains
Flora of the Sierra Nevada (United States)
Natural history of the California chaparral and woodlands
Natural history of the California Coast Ranges
Natural history of the Central Valley (California)
Natural history of the Channel Islands of California
Natural history of the Mojave Desert
Natural history of the Peninsular Ranges
Natural history of the San Francisco Bay Area
Natural history of the Santa Monica Mountains
Natural history of the Transverse Ranges
Plants used in traditional Native American medicine
Taxa named by Asa Gray
Taxa named by John Torrey
Taxa named by Edward Lee Greene
Flora without expected TNC conservation status